Lasowski is a surname. Notable people with the surname include:

Elisa Lasowski (born 1986), British actor
Vadzim Lasowski (born 1975), Belarusian footballer

See also
Laskowski